Linosta sinceralis is a moth in the family Crambidae. It was described by Heinrich Benno Möschler in 1882. It is found in the Guianas, Suriname, Ecuador, Colombia, southern Brazil and Peru.

Subspecies
Linosta sinceralis sinceralis (the Guianas, Suriname, the Amazons and possibly Venezuela)
Linosta sinceralis andina Munroe, 1959 (Ecuador, Colombia and Peru)
Linosta sinceralis plaumanni Munroe, 1959 (southern Brazil)

References

Moths described in 1882
Crambidae